The Battle of Bhima Koregaon: An Unending Journey is a 2017 documentary by Indian filmmaker Somnath Waghmare. It explored the role of 500 Mahar dalit soldiers of the East India Company in the Battle of Koregaon on 1 January 1818 against Peshwa rulers. It talks about dalit assertion on 1 January taking place every year. The 50 minute documentary was released in April 2017.

Production
For producing this documentary, Somnath Waghamare used Crowdfunding as he was still a PhD student at Tata Institute of Social Sciences. His topic of M.Phil. research was about caste and its portrayal in Marathi cinema.

Awards
The documentary was screened in first ever Dalit Film and Cultural Festival at Columbia University, New York.

See also
Battle of Koregaon
The Battle of Bhima Koregaon (film)

References

2017 films
Indian documentary films
Films about the caste system in India
Dalit communities
Dalit history
Films about social issues in India
Documentaries about historical events
Documentary films about historical events
Documentary films about India